David Marty (born March 27, 1972) is a former professional footballer who played as a striker.

External links
David Marty profile at chamoisfc79.fr

1972 births
Living people
French footballers
Association football forwards
Chamois Niortais F.C. players
Ligue 2 players
SO Romorantin players
Blois Football 41 players